Elmo Clifford Gideon (January 11, 1924 – December 21, 2010) was an American painter and sculptor of the 20th and 21st centuries.

Thursday, 12 April 2001, was declared “Gideon Day” with an official Proclamation by the Miami-Dade County Office of the Mayor and Board of County Commissioners.

Notes

External links
 The Gideon Holocaust Collection
 Artist's Homepage Featuring Bio and Images of Artwork

1924 births
2010 deaths
American sculptors
Civilian Conservation Corps people
People from Overland Park, Kansas